Christopher John Millar (born 30 July 1955), known by his stage name Rat Scabies, is a musician best known as the drummer for English punk rock band the Damned.

Career
Millar was born in Kingston upon Thames, Surrey. He played drums with Tor and London SS before founding the Damned with Brian James, Dave Vanian and Captain Sensible in 1976. He continued to play with the band with some interruptions and alongside various personnel changes until a dispute over the release of the album Not of This Earth led to his departure in 1995.

His solo work outside the Damned includes a cover version of Bob Dylan's "This Wheel's on Fire", credited to "Rat & The Whale". In 2003 Millar formed a short-lived outfit called the Germans with Peter Coyne and Kris Dollimore, originally from the Godfathers. In recent times, he has played with Donovan, Nosferatu, ska artist Neville Staple (formerly of the Specials) and his band, Dave Catching (Eagles of Death Metal), Chris Goss, the Members, the Mutants, the Spammed, Urban Voodoo Machine and Jane Horrocks. He has also worked as a producer, including with Flipron and Ebony Bones. In May 2018 he released his solo album P.H.D. (Prison, Hospital, Debt).

Personal life
Millar lives with his wife Viv and their three children in Brentford, and is the central character of the book Rat Scabies and The Holy Grail, written by former music journalist Christopher Dawes. The book was published in May 2005 and is billed as "A road trip, a rich historical yarn, and testimony to the odd nature of a great many friendships".

Equipment
Scabies uses vintage Leedy & George Hayman drum kits.
Over the years he has played various brands, starting with a John Grey 'Autocrat' kit in turquoise sparkle finish, before playing a black Pearl Maxwin kit (early 1970s to 1976), a white Pearl kit (late 1976–1981), a white Premier 'Resonator' kit (1982–1983), a Premier 'Black Shadow' kit (1984–1985), then a Premier 'Resonator' in piano black finish (1985–1996).

Discography

Albums
 Lord of the Flies (Nosferatu with Rat Scabies) (1998, Cleopatra Records (U.S.A & Canada, Hades Records (U.K. & Europe)
 Spiteful (Sonny Vincent & Spite Featuring Rat Scabies, Glen Matlock, Steve Mackay) (2014, Still Unbeatable Records)
P.H.D. (Prison, Hospital, Debt) (2018, Cleopatra)

Singles
 "Wheels On Fire" (as The Rat and The Whale) (1980, 7", Single)
 "Millionaire" (Magic Michael with Rat Scabies & Captain Sensible) (1980, 7", Single)
 "Let There Be Rats" (1984, 7", Single)
 "Mary Ann" (Sonny Vincent & Spite Feat. Rat Scabies, Glen Matlock & Steve Mackay) (2015)
 "Chew On You" (2018, Cleopatra)

References

External links
Rock supergroup The Spammed recording Tommy Gun - Specialized Project

The Damned (band) members
English punk rock drummers
People from Kingston upon Thames
1955 births
Living people
The Lords of the New Church members